Ronald Sengu (born 16 April 1988) is a Zimbabwean football defender.

References

1988 births
Living people
Zimbabwean footballers
Shooting Stars F.C. (Zimbabwe) players
Lengthens F.C. players
CAPS United players
Harare City F.C. players
Zimbabwe international footballers
Association football defenders
Zimbabwe Premier Soccer League players